Stéphane Besle (born 23 January 1984 in Haguenau) is a retired French footballer. He previously played for Swiss club Neuchâtel Xamax having signed with the team in summer 2005, along with teammate Matar Coly. Besle established himself as a first-choice central defender for Xamax and was the club's captain before being released in December 2011.

References

External links

Neuchatel Xamax profile

1984 births
Living people
People from Haguenau
Expatriate footballers in Switzerland
Association football defenders
French expatriate footballers
French expatriate sportspeople in Switzerland
French footballers
Ligue 1 players
Ligue 2 players
Neuchâtel Xamax FCS players
RC Lens players
FC Metz players
FC St. Gallen players
FC Aarau players
Swiss Super League players
Footballers from Alsace
Sportspeople from Bas-Rhin